Andrew Devine may refer to:
Andrew Devine (died 2021), 97th victim of the Hillsborough disaster
Archie Devine (1886–1964), Scottish footballer sometimes known as Andrew